Usman may refer to:

People
Usman (name), a name of Arabic origin.
Hadiza Bala Usman (born 1976), Nigerian activist and politician
Kamaru Usman, a mixed martial artist in the Ultimate Fighting Championship
Usman Janatin, an Indonesian marine executed for murder in Singapore

Places
Usman, alternative name of Vezman, a village in Kurdistan Province, Iran
Usman Urban Settlement, a municipal formation which Usman Town Under District Jurisdiction in Usmansky District of Lipetsk Oblast, Russia is incorporated as
Usman, Russia, a town in Lipetsk Oblast, Russia
Usman (river), a river in Russia; left tributary of the Voronezh

See also
Osman (disambiguation)
Ottoman Empire, also known as Osmanli, Empire of Osman (modern-day Turkey)
Uthman
 Tropical Depression Usman